The 2023 Princeton Tigers men's volleyball team represents Princeton University in the 2023 NCAA Division I & II men's volleyball season. The Tigers, led by fourteenth year head coach Sam Shweisky, play their home games at Dillon Gymnasium. The Tigers are members of the Eastern Intercollegiate Volleyball Association and were picked to finish third in the EIVA preseason poll. 

The Tigers enter 2023 as the defending EIVA tournament champions, though they suffered a NCAA 1st Round tournament loss to North Greenville.

Roster

Schedule

 *-Indicates conference match.
 Times listed are Eastern Time Zone.

Broadcasters
D'Youville: Trevor Butts
Daemen: Ryan Maxwell & Stephanie Albano
UCLA: Denny Cline
Pepperdine: Al Epstein
Concordia Irvine: Jeff Runyan
Ohio State: 
Ohio State: 
Sacred Heart: 
Tusculum: 
Cal State Northridge: 
St. Francis Brooklyn: 
Penn State: 
Penn State: 
Harvard: 
Harvard: 
Fairleigh Dickinson: 
NJIT: 
Grand Canyon: 
Grand Canyon: 
George Mason: 
George Mason: 
Charleston (WV): 
Charleston (WV): 
NJIT:

Rankings 

^The Media did not release a Pre-season or Week 1 poll.

Honors
To be filled in upon completion of the season.

References

2023 in sports in New Jersey 
2023 NCAA Division I & II men's volleyball season
Princeton